Ramiz Muradov (born 6 July 2005) is an Azerbaijani footballer who plays as a midfielder for Zira in the Azerbaijan Premier League.

Club career
On 12 August 2022, Muradov made his debut in the Azerbaijan Premier League for Zira match against Sabah.

References

External links
 

2005 births
Living people
Association football midfielders
Azerbaijani footballers
Azerbaijan Premier League players
Zira FK players